Holcosus parvus, also known commonly as the rainbow ameiva, is a species of lizard in the family Teiidae. The species is native to Costa Rica and Mexico.

References

parvus
Reptiles of North America
Reptiles described in 1915